Pseudoboodon is a genus of snakes in the family Lamprophiidae. The genus is endemic to Africa.

Species
Five species are recognized as being valid.
Pseudoboodon abyssinicus Mocquard, 1906 - Abyssinian house snake 
Pseudoboodon boehmei Rasmussen & Largen, 1992
Pseudoboodon gascae Peracca, 1897
Pseudoboodon lemniscatus (A.M.C. Duméril, Bibron & A.H.A. Duméril, 1854)
Pseudoboodon sandfordorum Spawls, 2004

Nota bene: A binomial authority in parentheses indicates that the species was originally described in a genus other than Pseudoboodon.

References

Further reading
Peracca MG (1897). "Intorno ad alcuni Ofidii raccolti a Maldi (Eritrea) dal capitano A. Gasca ". Bollettino dei Musei di Zoologia ed Anatomia comparata della R[egia]. Università di Torino 12 (273): 1-3. (Pseudoboodon, new genus, pp. 1–2; P. gascae, new species, pp. 2–3 + one unnumbered figure). (in Italian).

Pseudoboodon
Snake genera